or  is a Slavic surname. Notable people with the surname include:

Pavel Jozef Šafárik (1795–1861), Slovak philologist, poet, Slavist, literary historian, historian and ethnographer
Vojtěch Šafařík (1829–1902), Czech chemist, son of Pavel Jozef
8336 Šafařík, a main belt asteroid
Šafařík (crater), a small lunar impact crater on the far side of the Moon

Czech-language surnames
Slovak-language surnames